Haute-Gaspésie—La Mitis—Matane—Matapédia (formerly known as Matapédia—Matane) was a federal electoral district in Quebec, Canada, that was represented in the House of Commons of Canada from 1979 until 2013. It has the lowest percentage of visible minorities among all Canadian electoral districts (0.3%).

Geography

The district consists of the Regional County Municipalities of La Haute-Gaspésie, La Matapédia, Matane and La Mitis.

The neighbouring ridings are Rimouski-Neigette—Témiscouata—Les Basques, Montmorency—Charlevoix—Haute-Côte-Nord, Manicouagan, Gaspésie—Îles-de-la-Madeleine, and Madawaska—Restigouche.

History

The riding was created in 1933 as "Matapédia—Matane" from parts of Matane riding. It was abolished in 1966 when it was redistributed into Matane and Rimouski ridings.

It was created in 1976 as "Matapédia—Matane" from parts of Matane and Rimouski ridings. The name of the riding was changed in 2004 to "Haute-Gaspésie—La Mitis—Matane—Matapédia".

As per the 2012 federal electoral redistribution, this riding will be dissolved, and most will become part of Avignon—La Mitis—Matane—Matapédia and the remainder will join Gaspésie—Les Îles-de-la-Madeleine.

Members of Parliament

This riding has elected the following Members of Parliament:

Election results

Haute-Gaspésie—La Mitis—Matane—Matapédia, 2003 Representation Order

Matapédia—Matane, 2003 Representation Order

Matapédia—Matane, 1979–2000

Matapédia—Matane, 1933 - 1968

	
	
	

	

Note: Ralliement créditiste vote is compared to Social Credit vote in the 1963 election.

	
|-

| style="width: 160px"|Independent Social Credit
|Gérard Ratté
|align=right|344
|align=right|1.4
|-
	

	

	

	
	

Note: "National Government" vote is compared to Conservative vote in 1935 election.

See also
 List of Canadian federal electoral districts
 Past Canadian electoral districts

References

Campaign expense data from Elections Canada
Riding history for Matapédia—Matane 1979 - 2004 from the Library of Parliament
Riding history for Haute-Gaspésie—La Mitis—Matane—Matapédia 2004 - present from the Library of Parliament

Notes

Matane
Former federal electoral districts of Quebec